"Space Cowboy" is a song by German pop group Banaroo. In 2013, they released a new version of this song on their fifth studio album Bubblegum World.

Formats and track listings
These are the formats and track listings of major single releases of "Space Cowboy."

Maxi CD
 "Space Cowboy (Radio Edit)" - 3:49
 "Space Cowboy (Extended Version)" - 5:31
 "Space Cowboy (Remix)" - 5:03
 "Space Cowboy (Instrumental)" - 3:47
 "Space Cowboy (Video)" - 3:49

Charts

Weekly charts

Year-end charts

References 

Banaroo songs
2005 singles
Songs written by Terri Bjerre
Songs written by Thorsten Brötzmann
Songs written by Ivo Moring
2005 songs